

The Geodimeter (acronym of geodetic distance meter) was the first optical electronic distance meter surveying instrument.
It was originally developed for measuring the speed of light.
It was used in the Transcontinental Traverse.

The Geodimeter business was acquired by SpectraPrecision which was acquired by Trimble Inc.

Electronic mechanism
The mechanism uses a Kerr cell in an optical train that chops a collimated beam of light under the control of a precision electronic oscillator in the megahertz range. It is similar in principle to the mechanical chopper in Fizeau's measurement of the speed of light in air that used a toothed wheel.

See also
Laser rangefinder
Lidar
Tellurometer

References

Sources

Further reading

External links
 AGA Geodimeter Model 6 (Going the Distance: A Photo Collection Illustrating the History of Distance Measurement Tools at the National Geodetic Survey)

20th-century inventions
Surveying instruments
Swedish inventions